IM3 may refer to:

 Indosat Multimedia Mobile, a telecommunications subsidiary
 Iron Man 3, a 2013 film
 Innocenti IM3, a BMC car model
 Infamous Mobb, an American hip hop group